Arabella is a 1924 German silent drama film directed by Karl Grune and starring Mae Marsh, Alfons Fryland, and Fritz Rasp.

Cast
Mae Marsh as Arabella
Alfons Fryland
Fritz Rasp
Jakob Tiedtke
Fritz Kampers
Jaro Fürth
Hermann Picha

References

External links

Films of the Weimar Republic
Films directed by Karl Grune
German silent feature films
German black-and-white films
German drama films
1924 drama films
Silent drama films
1920s German films